Since 1867, the United States has considered, or made, several proposals to purchase the island of Greenland from Denmark, as it did with the Danish West Indies in 1917. While Greenland remains an autonomous territory within the Kingdom of Denmark, a 1951 treaty gives the United States much control over an island it once partially claimed from exploration.

Reasons for purchase

Early history of claims on Greenland 
In 1261, the Norse colonies in southern Greenland accepted Norwegian overlordship. While these colonies later died out in the 1400s, Norway's territorial claims to the area were not abandoned and continued to be asserted by Denmark-Norway after the union of the Danish and Norwegian realms in 1537. Beginning in 1721, missionaries and traders from Denmark-Norway began recolonizing southern Greenland. In 1775 Denmark-Norway declared Greenland a colony. Along with all other Norwegian dependencies, Greenland was formally transferred from Norway to Denmark by the Treaty of Kiel in 1814, and Denmark began trying to colonize all of the island in the 1880s.

The United States also had a strong claim on Greenland. Much of it was unexplored when the treaty was signed. American Charles Francis Hall was the first to see northwest Greenland, during the Polaris Expedition, and Robert Peary claimed much of the north. When the United States wanted to purchase the Danish West Indies during World War I, Denmark required the country to recognize the Danish claim over the whole island. United States Secretary of State Robert Lansing did so in 1917, and American opposition prevented an attempt by the United Kingdom to secure a right of first refusal if Denmark ever decided to sell. The British acted after John Douglas Hazen successfully proposed at the Imperial War Conference that the British Empire buy Greenland for Canada to prevent the United States from acquiring it.

Since 1823 the United States has, in the Monroe Doctrine, opposed expansion of foreign sovereignty in the Americas. Lansing's declaration was an exception to the doctrine, and influenced other countries. In 1919, Denmark asked other nations to recognize its sovereignty. Canada advised Britain to do so in 1920, and Britain reiterated that it should be consulted before any sale; France, Japan, Italy, and Sweden had no reservations. Denmark formally declared sovereignty over all of Greenland in 1921. Norway renewed a claim to Erik the Red's Land in 1931, but two years later the Permanent Court of International Justice ruled against the country, finding that the claim had been transferred to Denmark in 1814.

20th century 

Peary opposed the United States giving up its claim to Greenland, believing that doing so violated the Monroe Doctrine. He wanted to purchase the island for mineral wealth and to avoid foreign bases that would, as air and sea technology improved, threaten his country. During World War I, the United States decided that obtaining the Danish West Indies to defend the Panama Canal was more important, but in the 1920s General Billy Mitchell, advocating for expanding American air forces, wanted American bases on Greenland and Iceland.

By the early 1940s the government agreed about Greenland's importance to the Arctic policy of the United States. Before World War II, the island was part of RAINBOW 4, a contingency plan to deal with a siege of North America in which the United States was simultaneously attacked from every direction by every great power. In RAINBOW 4, American forces would preemptively seize all Dutch, Danish, and French possessions in the western hemisphere – including Greenland – and garrison them to form a defensive perimeter around the United States.

The German invasion of Denmark on April 9, 1940 gave that country a strong legal claim on Greenland in World War II. Because of its proximity to mainland North America and being the only known significant source of cryolite, and German attempts to use the island during the North Atlantic weather war, the United States for the first time applied the Monroe Doctrine on European colonies in the North Atlantic Ocean. Prior to landing, the Coast Guardsmen were formally discharged from service and reconstituted as a force of "volunteers" to create a legal fiction that would avoid charges of an American invasion of the country, the United States being neutral and the Danish government-in-exile not having agreed to the landing. The Danish government later agreed to the official entry of United States forces into Greenland, and the United States Army occupied the island in 1941.

In 1946 the Joint Chiefs of Staff listed Greenland and Iceland as two of the three essential international locations for American bases. During the creation of NATO, the two islands were seen as more important to American and Canadian defense than some Western European countries; Greenland is on the shortest polar route between Washington and Moscow, and about midway between the two cities. As Denmark is unable to defend an ice-covered island 50 times larger than itself, in April 1951 the country and the United States signed a treaty which gave the latter exclusive jurisdiction over defense areas within Greenland. Denmark recognized that without the agreement Greenland would become closer to the United States anyway, whether as a nominally independent country or with a Puerto Rico-like affiliation. The Pentagon told President Dwight Eisenhower that the Danes were "very cooperative in allowing the United States quite a free hand in Greenland". A Danish scholar later wrote that his country's sovereignty over the island during the Cold War was fictional, with the United States holding de facto sovereignty.

Circa 1953 in Operation Blue Jay the United States built Thule Air Base in northern Greenland. From 1959 the island was part of NORAD. Thule employed more than 1,000 Greenlanders and had almost 10,000 American personnel. It and about 50 other American bases performed duties such as tracking Soviet submarines in the GIUK gap. Camp Century was an experiment in polar engineering that presaged colonization of the Moon. The canceled Project Iceworm would have deployed 600 Minuteman missiles under the ice. United States interest abruptly declined after the Cold War; the NORAD radars were abandoned, "though  Thule, the United States’ northernmost air base houses the ...network of sensors, which provides early missile warning and space surveillance and control." and since 2004 Thule has been the only United States base, with a few hundred Americans. Post-Cold War United States disinterest in the island reportedly disappointed many Greenlanders; as late as 2004, proposals for American funding of climate research and scholarships did not succeed.

21st century 
The United States, Russia, and China increased their attention to Greenland and Arctic geopolitics in the early 21st century. American Secretary of State Hillary Clinton and her Russian counterpart Sergey Lavrov attended the 2010 Arctic five meeting. Rasmus Nielsen of the University of Greenland said in 2019, "The last couple of years we can see a bigger focus and also involvement that the U.S. wants to have [in Greenland]. You can feel that the U.S. is really waking up to Arctic reality – partly because of Russia, partly because of China".

United States 
American Ambassador to Denmark James P. Cain wrote in 2007 that Greenlandic independence was inevitable. His country had the opportunity to influence the structure of a new nation so should prepare by directly communicating with Greenland as the island gains autonomy. Ongoing American educational, cultural, and scientific programs strengthened relations with the future country and kept China out, Cain wrote. 

The island is still important to American and NATO security; Walter Berbrick of the Naval War College said in 2019, "Whoever holds Greenland will hold the Arctic. It's the most important strategic location in the Arctic and perhaps the world". The United States emphasizes Greenland's North American geography, and American diplomatic and military officials and the United States Geological Survey (USGS) often visit the island. In 2018 the Americans reestablished the United States Second Fleet, responsible for the North Atlantic; Berbrick proposed basing the fleet in Greenland, and Under Secretary of Defense for Policy John Rood signed an agreement to invest in dual-use infrastructure. Henrik Breitenbauch of the University of Copenhagen said that the agreement, which Greenland welcomed, was part of increasing American emphasis on defending North America. The island could be where the United States builds the new strategic Arctic port that the National Defense Authorization Act for Fiscal Year 2020 mandates.

In 2019 Greenland asked the United States for an aerial survey. Planned before but occurring after the Trump administration purchase proposal, the United States Navy used hyperspectral imaging over Garðar and the USGS interpreted the data to search for mineral resources. Greenland in April 2020 accepted a $12.1 million American grant. Denmark in December 2019 approved a Trump administration request for a consulate in Greenland. Opened during World War II and closed in 1953, the consulate reopened in June 2020, a day after the administration announced that it would build a new icebreaker fleet. Nick Solheim of the Wallace Institute for Arctic Security said that the two acts "are the most monumental things we’ve done in Arctic policy in the last 40 years".

Reuters described Greenland in October 2020 as "a security black hole" for the United States and allies, and that its 27,000 miles (44,000 km) of coastline was difficult to monitor. "On several occasions since 2006, foreign vessels have turned up unexpectedly or without the necessary protocols, in waters that NATO-member Denmark aims to defend", the news agency reported. Detection of foreign vessels, including a Russian submarine, has often been by accident. The security concerns described included the presence of Russian ships believed to have the ability to map the ocean floor, and deploy robots that could tap undersea cables or sever them during a conflict.

China 
As part of the Arctic policy of China, the country in 2018 declared itself a "near-Arctic state". Chinese interest in Greenland began when Prime Minister of Greenland Hans Enoksen visited the country in 2005. Minister of Land and Resources Xu Shaoshi visited Greenland in 2012. China is interested in polar science, infrastructure, and natural resources, while Greenland wants outside investment; more delegations have visited China than the United States. China is the largest outside investor, with $2 billion in investments from 2012 to 2017 accounting for 11.6% of island GDP. Shenghe Resources owns 12.5% of Greenland Minerals, which in 2018 agreed to let Shenghe oversee extraction at Kvanefjeld. Although the island imports little from China it is Greenland's second-largest export partner after Denmark. Chinese imports of Greenlandic fish were the bulk of their $126 million in trade in the first seven months of 2019.

China collaborates with Greenlandic scientific projects, and encourages Chinese cultural activities. In 2016, the island permitted the State Oceanic Administration to build a research station. In 2017, the Danish government declined a proposal from a Chinese mining company to purchase an abandoned naval base on Greenland over concerns the arrangement would hurt relations with the United States. When Greenland's prime minister flew to Beijing to ask for financial assistance to build two airports, the United States persuaded Denmark to instead provide  billion.  As of February 2021, three airports planning projects are underway: Nuuk Airport, Ilulissat Airport and Qaqortoq Airport. They are planned for Kalaallit Airports.

Denmark 
Greenland gives Denmark a role in the Arctic—it is a member of the Arctic Council, and as one of the five Arctic littoral states, a signatory to the Ilulissat Declaration—but Danish investors have little presence, although one fifth of Greenlanders live in Denmark.  Denmark's Arctic Command has one aircraft, four helicopters, four ships, and six dog sleds to patrol the entire island.

Denmark in 2019 announced that it would spend  billion to monitor Greenland. The Ministry of Foreign Affairs in 2020 sent an advisor on security issues to the Greenlandic government. Minister of Defence Trine Bramsen denied that her government sent the advisor because of the American consulate, but Rasmus Gjedssø Bertelsen of University of Tromsø said that Denmark did not want Greenland and the consulate to communicate directly, excluding Copenhagen. Bramsen said that increased American cooperation with Greenland was good for the kingdom.

European Union 
The European Union (EU) is the great power that is least interested in Greenland. After the withdrawal of Greenland from the European Communities in 1985, it remained one of the union's Overseas Countries and Territories and islanders are EU citizens. The EU's annual subsidy of about €30 million is unlikely to greatly increase, the island is ineligible for the European Development Fund, and no EU diplomats are there. The union's need for a domestic source of rare earths, and a desire to decrease dependence on China after the COVID-19 pandemic, may increase interest.

Political status 
Greenland is an autonomous territory within the Kingdom of Denmark, and many islanders opposed Danish interference in the airport deal.  Greenlandic independence is possible at any time based on Danish law; with Greenland Home Rule, elected leaders decide most internal affairs. Denmark controls foreign affairs and guards sea borders, while the United States controls external defense; while the latter cannot increase its presence without consent from Denmark and Greenland, under the 1951 agreement it pays no rent for bases, and has almost complete authority within "defense areas" Denmark and the United States agree to within NATO. American forces and civilians have free access to and between defense areas, and can freely fly over the island; Denmark has little ability to act in Greenland where United States national security is involved. The American presence benefits Danish civil authority over the island, however, and allows the country to spend less on NATO while avoiding having foreign troops on Danish soil. Greenlandic governments have stated their intention to join NATO as an independent country, welcome increasing United States interest, and do not oppose the American presence if the island benefits from United States investments in jobs and infrastructure.

 Denmark is by far Greenland's largest trade partner, receiving 55% of the island's exports and providing 63% of imports.  it subsidizes Greenland with  billion annually, up from  billion in 2009. About two-thirds of Greenlanders support independence, but most do not believe that it is viable without the Danish subsidy. The island, three times the size of Texas, has vast natural resources, including uranium, rare-earth minerals, and estimated 50 billion barrels of offshore oil and gas. Greenland has only one operating mine and little infrastructure, however; it has one commercial international airport, and no roads connect the 17 towns. Although Denmark has relinquished control over raw materials to the island, a 2014 report stated that replacing the subsidy would require 24 large projects each costing  billion, one opening every two years. As no investors existed for such projects, the report by 13 scholars said that Greenland would remain dependent on the Danish subsidy for at least 25 years to maintain its welfare system.

Denmark was reluctant to pay for the airports because it sees the island seeking investment as preparing for independence. Icelandic scholar Gudmundur Alfredsson, one of the authors of the 2014 report, said that it overemphasized Greenland's membership in the Danish kingdom. He said that the island should consider Denmark one of several competitors, and that the United States or Canada might provide more funding.

Proposals

1867 

In 1867, United States Secretary of State William H. Seward negotiated the Alaska Purchase from the Russian Empire. He that year considered the idea of United States annexation of both Greenland and Iceland an idea "worthy of serious consideration". Seward commissioned a report (A Report on the Resources of Iceland and Greenland, Peirce 1868), but made no offer.

1910 
A proposal for acquisition of Greenland was discussed within the American government in 1910 by United States Ambassador to Denmark Maurice Francis Egan. As suggested by Danish "persons of importance" who were friends of Egan, the United States would trade Mindanao for Greenland and the Danish West Indies; Denmark could then trade Mindanao to Germany for Northern Schleswig. Denmark regained Northern Schleswig from Germany after the German defeat in World War I following the 1920 Schleswig plebiscites.

1946 

In 1946, the United States offered Denmark $100 million ($ billion today) in gold bullion for Greenland. United States Senator Owen Brewster said in November 1945 that he considered buying the island "a military necessity". The planning and strategy committee of the Joint Chiefs of Staff determined in April 1946 that acquiring the "completely worthless to Denmark" island was vital to the United States.

William C. Trimble of the State Department agreed that while "there are few people in Denmark who have any real interest in Greenland, economic, political or financial", owning it would give the United States staging areas from which to launch military operations over the Arctic against America's adversaries. He suggested the $100 million price, and discussed an alternate offer of land in Point Barrow, Alaska. Had the Alaska trade occurred, from 1967 Denmark would have benefited from Prudhoe Bay Oil Field, the richest petroleum discovery in American history. Secretary of State James F. Byrnes made the $100 million offer on December 14, 1946, in a memorandum delivered to Danish foreign minister Gustav Rasmussen when he visited Washington.

The memorandum described the American position on what to do about an informal agreement made in 1941 by Danish Ambassador to the United States Henrik Kauffmann to station United States forces on Greenland. It suggested three alternatives: Two variations on the 1941 agreement—A 99-year lease on the existing American bases there, or the United States wholly taking over the defense of the island—or the purchase of Greenland. The United States preferred to purchase and believed that doing so was better for Denmark, as it would prevent criticism of American bases on Danish soil and save Denmark the cost of supporting Greenland. The American told the Dane that a sale "would be the most clean-cut and satisfactory".

"Our needs ... seemed to come as a shock to Rasmussen", Byrnes said. The memorandum indeed surprised the Dane; rumors at the time stated that the United States wanted to purchase Greenland, but the Danish government's position was that the United States would withdraw its troops, based upon language in the 1941 Kauffmann agreement that it remained in force "until agreement has been reached that current threats to the peace and security of the American continent have ended". The Danish government understood that the threats were the world war;
it did not know that the U.S. understood this to include postwar threats from the Soviet Union as well.

Rasmussen declined all three options, and returned to Denmark. He told United States Ambassador Josiah Marvel, "[w]hile we owe much to America I do not feel that we owe them the whole island of Greenland". The American offer surprised Rasmussen because of duplicity by Kauffmann, who with a friend at the United States Department of State advocated for an American presence in Greenland while not fully informing the Danish government. Kauffmann had minimized in his reports the importance of proposals of a takeover or purchase in the U.S. House of Representatives, saying that the idea was considered ridiculous by the U.S. government, when in fact it was not. He had also not conveyed important parts of a 1945 American proposal to keep its bases on the island after the war. Rasmussen visited Washington in 1946 expecting to annul the 1941 agreement, not understanding because of Kauffmann's duplicity why nothing had happened with the Danish government's previous overtures in that regard.

Reporting on the United States military's interest in purchasing it, Time in January 1947 stated that Lansing had erred in relinquishing the American claim to "the world's largest island and stationary aircraft carrier". The magazine predicted that Greenland "would be as valuable as Alaska during the next few years" for defense. Time observed that despite national pride "Denmark owes U.S. investors $70 million" while the country had a shortage of dollars, and rumors in Copenhagen stated that the price for the island would be $1 billion ($ billion today), or almost four times Denmark's aid from the Marshall Plan.

Selling Greenland might have made a return to Denmark's traditional neutrality easier, and would have provided funds the country greatly needed after the war. All Danish political parties rejected selling the island when they heard the rumors, however. Jens Sønderup said in a 1947 budget debate:

Rasmussen responded in the debate that the idea was absurd, and declared Denmark unwilling in any way to cede sovereignty over Greenland. The West Indies were only an investment to Danes, but from the Danish Golden Age of the 19th century they saw Danish overseas colonies in the North Atlantic, including Greenland, as part of their Viking history and national identity. The island was for Denmark similar to the British Raj for the United Kingdom, and Danes felt a paternalistic, "White Man's Burden"-like responsibility for its people. While Greenland did not contribute to the Danish economy, Denmark planned to expand trade and resource extraction there..

By offering to purchase Greenland, the United States told Denmark that it was not likely to ever leave. Denmark would not fully understand for another decade the island's strategic importance to the United States. The Danish government's own outlook on national security was more parochial, and did not extend to viewing Greenland as a part of that. The legal status of the 1941 arrangement was unsettled, with the United States still pressing for purchase and Denmark rejecting the offer, leaving matters at the status quo ante until the 1960s.

After the November 1947 Danish Folketing election, the new government of Hans Hedtoft continued and expanded Kauffmann's strategy of duplicity.
To the Danish public, it maintained that the United States would withdraw from Greenland as expected. To the United States the Hedtoft government stated that its own private position was that the American presence would remain. Its own private position was to persuade the United States to withdraw. Kauffmann likewise continued with his own personal agenda. The Danish government was not duplicitous on one point: It was not going to outright cede Greenland to a foreign power.

Marvel told Rasmussen that he should not do anything that would lead to the disclosure of anything that had transpired in Rasmussen's meeting with Byrnes. The Danish government kept the American interest secret from the public, as part of its own strategy. The 1947 offer was classified until the 1970s, and Jyllands-Posten reported on it in 1991.

By spring 1948 Denmark gave up on persuading the Americans to leave. Part of why the country joined NATO, Trade Minister Jens Otto Krag wrote in his diary, was that since "the USA's de facto partial occupation of Greenland (which we do not possess the power to prevent)" would cause the Soviet Union to see his country as an American ally, Denmark should benefit from the relationship. A scholar wrote in 1950 that, despite official denials of the rumors of an American purchase, because of Greenland's large expense to Denmark and strategic importance, "the potential sale of the island to the United States remains a distinct possibility". Some Danes hoped that as a NATO member the United States would discuss Greenlandic issues multilaterally, or vacate the bases as Denmark was an ally, but such did not occur. The April 1951 agreement between Denmark and the United States—which finally ended the 1941 agreement—stated, however, that it would remain in force as long as the NATO treaty did.

2019 

U.S. President Donald Trump discussed the idea of purchasing Greenland with senior advisers and Senator Tom Cotton, who proposed buying the island to Danish ambassador Lars Gert Lose in August 2018. Australian geologist Greg Barnes discussed the island's rare earths with 20 administration officials at the White House in July 2019. Supporters of an acquisition in and out of the Trump administration, including the Bureau of Oceans and International Environmental and Scientific Affairs, reportedly discussed expanding the American partnership with the island, including a possible purchase. One official stated that the United States can subsidize Greenland for much more than Denmark can;  the subsidy is less than the annual budget of El Paso, Texas. Cotton said that he suggested the purchase to the president because of the island's importance to American national security and great economic potential. "Anyone who can't see that is blinded by Trump derangement", Cotton said.

When the Wall Street Journal reported on Trump's discussions in August 2019, Premier of Greenland Kim Kielsen, Greenland's Minister of Foreign Affairs Ane Lone Bagger, the Greenlandic representatives in the Parliament of Denmark, Prime Minister of Denmark Mette Frederiksen, previous Prime Minister of Denmark and de facto leader of the opposition coalition Lars Løkke Rasmussen, and members of other parties, from the far-left Red–Green Alliance to the far-right Danish People's Party all rejected a sale. Statements ranged from simple diplomatic comments that "Greenland is not for sale" to strong refusals calling the idea of a sale of Greenland and its people "completely ridiculous". Some politicians suggested that Trump's proposal to buy Greenland had to be a joke. Frederiksen, already in Greenland, said "This is an absurd discussion" as "Greenland is not for sale. Greenland is not Danish. Greenland is Greenlandic". The prime minister emphasized Denmark's desire to continue close Denmark–United States relations, stating that she was open to increasing the American military presence.

On 20 August 2019, Trump canceled a planned state visit of the United States to Denmark over Frederiksen's remarks rejecting the possibility of a sale. The cancellation came shortly after Carla Sands, the American ambassador, had tweeted that "Denmark is ready for the POTUS @realDonaldTrump visit! Partner, ally, friend" and reportedly surprised the Danish government; according to the New York Times, Denmark was bewildered by the news. The Danish government quickly communicated to the United States its support of American policy, including in the Arctic; the following day, Frederiksen invited "stronger cooperation" with the United States on Arctic affairs. After reiterating that Greenland was not for sale, Frederiksen repeated her statement about the importance of the United States alliance in English to ensure that American officials heard her words. The Danish attempt to placate the larger country apparently worked; later that day, United States Secretary of State Mike Pompeo phoned Danish foreign minister Jeppe Kofod, praising the Danish–American cooperation in the Arctic region, including Greenland, and the alliance between the two countries. Both also confirmed their intentions of strengthening the cooperation in the region. Danish analyst Kristian Mouritzen said that Pompeo helped Frederiksen "smooth things out with Trump", averting what was "becoming a very big problem for Denmark".

A diplomat in Beijing said that Trump was likely thinking of China when he offered to purchase Greenland. The president's interest showed that "the United States does not intend to leave ... which Greenland can do nothing about. Neither can Denmark" since 1941, Bo Lidegaard said. "That's just how it is in a world where ultimately the strongest are the ones to decide", with China and Russia worse alternatives, he added. Andreas Bøje Forsby of the University of Copenhagen said that Trump's interest was "a very clear signal to both China and Denmark that Greenland is part of an exclusive American strategic zone". Admiral , former head of the Royal Danish Navy, said "Trump's approach may be wacky but it does send a serious message to Russia and China – don't mess with us on Greenland. This is a complete game-changer".

American purchase supporters do not mention the Greenlandic independence movement in official documents to avoid annoying the Danish. Because the island can declare independence, it can affiliate with the United States. "The only way Trump would be able to buy Greenland would be to give them an offer they couldn't turn down", Ulrik Pram Gad of Aalborg University said. Jon Rahbek-Clemmensen of the Royal Danish Defence College predicted difficult negotiations for Denmark. He expected the island to seek diplomatic and financial benefits from Denmark and the United States, and Greenland and the United States possibly to negotiate bilaterally. Agreeing that they should negotiate without Denmark, The London Globalist suggested that "The United States should make clear that ... this [subsidy] will be enlarged enormously, however blunt and unseemly this instrument may be".

Islanders could use the possibility of American affiliation when negotiating with Denmark, said Thorsten Borring Olesen of Aarhus University. Poul Krarup, editor-in-chief of Sermitsiaq, said that the American interest started a new domestic debate that might result in the island becoming more autonomous or independent from Denmark. He said that Greenlanders do not want to sell to the United States but want to cooperate as an equal partner, suggesting that Trump visit the island instead of Denmark to negotiate. While a majority of Greenlanders prefer Denmark to the United States, most prefer the latter to China. Another Greenlander hoped that Trump's interest would cause Denmark to "wake up and show Greenland some respect. A lot of Danes think everyone here is just a drunk Inuit. But now that America wants to buy us, maybe they can see there is much of value here". A third said that "for hundreds of years [Danes] earned many, many billions of kroner from Greenland" while neglecting Greenlanders, and hoped that the American attention would give them more power when negotiating with Denmark.

Krarup said that Greenlanders Trump offended with his offer were also angry at Denmark for discussing Greenland without them. While Trump needed to "change [his] attitude", Krarup hoped that the president's interest would change the island's political situation. Among Greenlandic politicians, Folketing MP Aaja Chemnitz Larsen said that the Danish government was already treating her island differently because of Trump. Frederiksen's "Greenland is not Danish. Greenland is Greenlandic" statement was, Gad said, the first time a Danish prime minister said that the island had some control over foreign or security issues. Pele Broberg of Partii Naleraq stated that with the American willingness to replace the Danish subsidy, Greenland had an alternative to Danish disinterest in Greenlandic independence. While rejecting a purchase he said that Denmark was not better than the United States, which already can do what it wants in Greenland. He proposed that the island begin the process in Danish law of becoming independent, and negotiate directly with the United States for American military and financial support.  of the Democrats agreed, stating that Greenland should use Trump's offer to become independent of the Danish subsidy.

Tillie Martinussen of the Cooperation Party disagreed with replacing the Danish subsidy with another country's, and warned of risks to the island's education and health care with a United States affiliation. Describing Broberg's proposal as inappropriate, Siumut stated that Greenland needed to become independent without any subsidy, and that the island should cooperate more with Denmark and the United States. The Atassut Party said that remaining within the Danish Kingdom was preferable, with the subsidy, other Danish assistance, and Folketing representation among benefits Greenland would lose with an American affiliation. Søren Espersen of the Danish People's Party called Broberg naive for wanting to leave the kingdom, stating that "the United States will swallow Greenland in a single mouthful" after independence and would not replace the Danish subsidy. Former foreign minister Martin Lidegaard of the Danish Social Liberal Party also advised against Greenland negotiating for an American subsidy, as "the United States is not a type of nation that gives something for free". Aqqaluk Lynge—former head of the Inuit Circumpolar Conference—opposed affiliating with the United States, describing the offer as an attack on Danish sovereignty and Greenlandic independence.

Islanders hoped that the publicity from Trump's interest would increase outside investment and tourism in Greenland. A real-estate company in Nuuk reported that international inquiries rose from one or two a year to 10 in the week after Trump's proposal. Krarup said that the president had "done us a service; he has made Greenland known throughout the world. The best advertisement we could get". The island needs American investment and subsidy for airports, roads, and United States air routes, Krarup said, which would also make Greenland more independent from Denmark. After the president joked that he would not build a Trump Tower there, Nordic travel agencies saw significantly more interest in tourism on the island; Krarup said that Greenlanders enjoyed the joke and interpreted it as Trump saying that he does not want to destroy Greenlandic culture, many responding on social media with "Make Greenland Great Again". Greenland's tourism bureau listed Trump's offer and previous American interest in the island on its website.

Martin Lidegaard, Weekendavisen, Breitenbauch, and Hans Mouritzen of the Danish Institute for International Studies were among those who said that Trump forced Denmark to not ignore Greenland as usual, and imagine the two apart. Kielsen and Frederiksen likely will support additional American bases; Breitenbauch said that because the United States is his country's most important security partner, he described as a nightmare for Denmark the possibility of Trump demanding it choose between fulfilling the Wales Summit Declaration of defense spending as 2% of GDP, or keeping Greenland. Whether the island is independent or affiliated with Denmark or America, Breitenbauch said, the United States would continue military supremacy and to restrict foreign investments that affect national security.

Reopening its consulate increased American influence on islanders, and was consistent with Cain's 2007 proposal for directly communicating with Greenland. Vice President of the United States Mike Pence said that reopening it was "the culmination of the administration's efforts to strengthen our engagement in the Arctic region". Larsen said in October 2019 that the consulate was part of "a massive charm offensive from the US and 'soft power' in diplomacy", and that because of Danish neglect of its responsibilities in Greenland, a majority on the island might support American annexation in five to ten years. Espersen in November accused Greenlandic finance minister Vittus Qujaukitsoq of secret bilateral negotiations with American officials, defying Danish authority over foreign and security policy. As part of the "American charm offensive" ambassadors since Cain in 2007 had, Espersen said, "methodically prepared for the day when Greenland declares itself independently – so that the US could move in on the island at the same time". He asked Greenland to choose between Denmark and the United States. Qujaukitsoq denied the claim and said that his schedule of American meetings was public. While criticizing Espersen for distrusting the island's officials, Martin Lidegaard said that the United States had "aggressive interest in ... Greenland and the Arctic".

Others 
In 1939, United States Secretary of State Cordell Hull's staff advised him to not offer to buy Greenland. United States Secretary of War Harry Woodring said that the island was too far from American sea or air routes.

During the 1970s, Vice President of the United States Nelson Rockefeller suggested buying Greenland for mining. The proposal was first publicly reported in 1982 by Rockefeller's speechwriter Joseph E. Persico in his book The Imperial Rockefeller.

Previous acquisitions of Danish territory by the United States 
In 1917, Denmark sold the Danish West Indies to the United States, which were renamed the United States Virgin Islands and made an unincorporated territory of the United States.

American goals of acquisition 
An acquisition of Greenland would give the United States permanent possession of an island that is crucial to its defense. The country would acquire vast amounts of natural resources—whether found or expected—including petroleum and rare minerals; the island has the largest deposits of rare earths outside China. Climate change may by 2030 make the Northern Sea Route the first of the Arctic shipping routes to be ice-free, connecting the Atlantic and Pacific oceans and greatly improving accessibility of Greenland's resources.

The United States would become the second-largest nation in the world by land area, after the Russian Federation. It would be the single-largest territorial acquisition in American history, slightly larger than the Louisiana Purchase.

Purchase price estimates of Greenland 
In August 2019, the Washington Post estimated the purchase price of Greenland would fall between $200 million and $1.7 trillion, with a middle estimate of $42.6 billion. The lower figure was based on an inflation and size-adjusted valuation of what the United States paid for Alaska, and the higher figure based on a price-to-earnings ratio of 847, which the newspaper said might be justified based on future valuations of its mineral deposits combined with the possibility that it might become a residential destination due to the effects of climate change. FT Alphaville estimated a $1.1 trillion price for the territory. Its sum-of-the-parts analysis valued potential oil fields at $300 to 400 billion, rare-earth minerals at $500 to 700 billion, and real estate at $200 to $220 billion. The newspaper wrote that the US has "a history of accretive land acquisitions", with a 7.1% internal rate of return for the Louisiana Purchase, 7.4% for Manhattan, and 9.0% for Alaska. 24/7 Wall Street estimated a purchase price for Greenland of $533 billion, using Wyoming as a comparable. "If the United States wants it for the strategic value of its property, both on land and offshore, and to project military power, the answer is that a value of $500 billion is not overly rich", 24/7 Wall Street concluded.

See also 
 Hans Island – a Greenland island previously subject of a territorial dispute between Canada and Denmark
 Territorial expansion of the United States
 51st state#Greenland
 List of territory purchased by a sovereign nation from another sovereign nation

References

Bibliography 

 
 
 
 
 
 

Denmark–United States relations
Greenland–United States relations
1867 in the United States
1910 in the United States
1946 in the United States
2019 in the United States
History of United States expansionism
Proposals in North America
Greenland
Politics of Greenland
Public policy proposals

fr:Histoire du Groenland#Propositions de rachat par les États-Unis